The Order of the Supreme Sun (Nishan-i-Lmar-i-Ala) was a decoration of the former Kingdom of Afghanistan.

The Order was instituted in 1920 by King Amanullah Khan and discontinued in 1973 upon the abolition of the Afghan monarchy. It was awarded for services to the state and had four grades (Collar, 1st, 2nd and 3rd Classes) and a Medal of Merit.

The Order's ribbon was blue with a central red stripe (until 1960).

After 1960 the Order's ribbon was sky blue with two red lateral stripes.

Recipients 
 Akihito
 Humaira Begum
 Soraya Tarzi
 Soekarno
 Queen Elizabeth The Queen Mother
 Ludvík Svoboda
 Farouk of Egypt
 Fuad I of Egypt
 George VI
 Iskander Mirza
 Józef Piłsudski
 Mohammad Reza Pahlavi
 Abdul Reza Pahlavi
 Ali Reza Pahlavi
 Prince Philip, Duke of Edinburgh
 Tribhuvan of Nepal

Supreme Sun
Awards disestablished in 1973